The Lapa de Gargantáns is a menhir located in the Galician municipality of Moraña, dated between 3,000–2,000 BC and discovered in 1958.

Description 
It is 1.92 meters high and 50 centimeters in diameter, its base is cut, so probably the original height was greater. Several petroglyphs are engraved on its surface.

In Galician, the word lapa, among other meanings, designates a stone that marks a burial. However, its exact function is unknown, and some archaeologists associate it with funerary, religious or commemorative signs, or ancient territorial boundaries between tribes.

References

External links 

 3D model of the menhir

Megalithic monuments in Spain
Archaeological sites in Galicia (Spain)